The 2006–07 Guinness Premiership was the 20th season of the top flight of the English domestic rugby union competitions, played between September 2006 and May 2007. It was announced during the 2005-06 season that the 2006-07 competition would end two weeks early due to the 2007 Rugby World Cup in France, as England would be defending their title. At the end of the previous season, Harlequins gained promotion to this season, while the Leeds Tykes were relegated. The Champions of this season were Leicester Tigers, beating Gloucester RFC 44-16 on 12 May in the Final at Twickenham, while the Northampton Saints were relegated. Leeds returned in 2007–08, under their new name of Leeds Carnegie, after being promoted.

From the start of the season, all half-time intervals were increased from the traditional 10 minutes to 15 minutes. The move has been explained as allowing clubs to capitalise on growing capacities and maximise refreshment income.

Two of the opening games of the season were played at Twickenham, in the 2006 London Double Header.

Participating teams 

Notes

Table

If teams are level at any stage, they are ranked by: 1. number of wins 2. league points 3. match points difference 4. match points for 5. head-to-head record.

Results

Round 1

Round 2

Round 3

Round 4

Round 5

Round 6

Round 7

Round 8

Round 9

Round 10

Round 11

Round 12

Round 13

Round 14

Round 15

Round 16

Round 17

Round 18

Round 19

Rearranged fixtures

Round 20

Round 21

Round 22

Play-offs

Semi-finals

Final

Individual statistics

Note: Flags to the left of player names indicate national team as has been defined under World Rugby eligibility rules, or primary nationality for players who did not earn international senior caps. Players may hold one or more non-WR nationalities.

Most points 
Source:

Most tries
Source:

Total Season Attendances

References

External links
 Official site

 
2006-07
 
England